Swedeland is a small unincorporated community in Upper Merion Township, Montgomery County, Pennsylvania, United States, in the suburbs of Philadelphia. It was founded as "Matsunk" by Swedish settlers in 1710. The name was changed to Swedeland sometime in the late 19th century.

History
Situated along the Schuylkill River and the Matsunk Creek, the Swedish village was composed of about 19 homes. After the conquering of the Swedish colony by the Dutch, followed by English control, in 1664, a third generation settler with the New Sweden Colony named Peter Yocum the Third (1678–1753) established Swedeland. William Penn offered the Swedish and Finnish colonists land from his grant in this Upper Merion area.

By the mid-19th century, Abraham Supplee operated a factory producing Kentucky Jean, employing some 25 hands.  The extensive works of the Swede Iron Company were also here, consisting of two large furnaces and a railroad leading from the iron ore mines to the Schuylkill River.

The land in the vicinity Swedeland/Matsunk was known for its fertile soil, limestone and iron ore quarries. The Alan Wood Steel Company built a massive steel Plant and Coking Facility in Swedeland in 1919; this brought forth a need for additional housing. Alan Wood Steel operated into the early 1980s.

The Swedeland Volunteer Fire Company was formed in 1920 and continues to protect the citizens of Upper Merion and nearby communities. Swedeland has continued its industrial heritage and is surrounded by pharmaceutical giant GlaxoSmithKline, chemical manufacturer Lonza, the Renaissance Business Park and The Philadelphia Newspapers Incorporated Complex.

References

See also
New Sweden

Unincorporated communities in Montgomery County, Pennsylvania
Unincorporated communities in Pennsylvania
1710 establishments in Pennsylvania
Upper Merion Township, Montgomery County, Pennsylvania